Sin Poh Amalgamated Limited may refer to:
 Sin Poh Amalgamated (Hong Kong) Limited Hong Kong newspaper publisher
 Sin Poh (Star News) Amalgamated Limited Singapore-incorporated newspaper publisher in Singapore and Malaysia.
 Sin Poh (Star News) Amalgamated (Malaysia) Sendirian Berhad, see Sin Chew Daily